The Sabarmati BG–Daulatpur Chowk Intercity Express   is an express train belonging to currently western Railway

The Jaipur–Daulatpur Chowk Intercity Express is an Intercity train belonging to North Wetrern  with 19411/19412 train no on daily basis. It is currently being operated with 19717/19718 train numbers on a daily basis.

This train also known as Ahir-Jat Express in Haryana.

Service

The 19717/Jaipur–Daulatpur Chowk Intercity Express has an average speed of 47 km/hr and covers 571 km in 12h 15m. The 19718/Daulatpur Chowk–Jaipur Intercity Express has an average speed of 47 km/hr and covers 571 km in 12h 15m.

Route and halts 

The important halts of the train are:

 
 
 
 
 
 
 
 
 
 
 
 
 
 
 
 
 
 
 Daulatpur Chowk

Coach composition

The train has standard ICF rakes with a max speed of 110 kmph. The train consists of 14 coaches:

 1 AC II Tier
 3 AC III Tier
 4 Sleeper coaches
 4 General Unreserved
 2 Seating cum Luggage Rake

Traction

Both trains are hauled by an Abu Road Loco Shed based WDM-2 diesel locomotive from Jaipur to Chandigarh and vice versa.

Direction reversal

The train reverses its direction 1 times:

See also 

 Jaipur Junction railway station
 Chandigarh Junction railway station

Notes

References

External links 

 19717/Jaipur - Chandigarh Intercity Express
 19718/Chandigarh - Jaipur Intercity Express

Intercity Express (Indian Railways) trains
Rail transport in Rajasthan
Rail transport in Haryana
Rail transport in Chandigarh
Transport in Jaipur
Railway services introduced in 2014